White Birch Cemetery is a cemetery in Gresham, Oregon, established in 1889.

See also

 Escobar Cemetery
 Gresham Pioneer Cemetery

References

External links

 White Birch Cemetery at the City of Gresham, Oregon
 

1889 establishments in Oregon
Cemeteries in Oregon
Gresham, Oregon